The Iris Skipper or Scrub Darter (Arrhenes dschilus) is a butterfly of the family Hesperiidae. It is found in New Guinea and Queensland.

The wingspan is about 30 mm.

The larvae feed on Imperata cylindrica, Panicum maximum and Saccharum officinarum.

Subspecies
Arrhenes dschilus dschilus
Arrhenes dschilus decor
Arrhenes dschilus iris (Queensland)

External links
Australian Insects

Taractrocerini